Kurudampalayam is a census town in Coimbatore district in the Indian state of Tamil Nadu.

Demographics
 India census, Kurudampalayam had a population of 13,129. Males constitute 54% of the population and females 46%. Kurudampalayam has an average literacy rate of 76%, higher than the national average of 59.5%: male literacy is 82%, and female literacy is 68%. In Kurudampalayam, 9% of the population is under 6 years of age.

References

Villages in Coimbatore district